Valery Valynin (born 10 December 1986 in Krasnodar) is a Russian cyclist.

Palmares
2006
2nd Tallinn-Tartu GP
2007
1st Stage 3 Five Rings of Moscow
2009
2nd Mayor Cup
2010
2nd Grand Prix of Moscow
3rd Overall Grand Prix of Adygea

References

1986 births
Living people
Russian male cyclists